Harry Lee Jones (July 25, 1945 – December 11, 2016) was an American football running back who played in the National Football League (NFL). He was a first-round selection (19th overall pick) by the Philadelphia Eagles in the 1967 NFL Draft, and played from 1967 to 1970 for the Eagles. He played college football at Arkansas.

Playing career

College
Jones played college football for the Arkansas Razorbacks. In 1965, Jones set a then-school record for rushing yards in a game with 293 yards. He also led the nation in yards per rush in 1965. In 1966, he was an All-American.

Professional

Philadelphia Eagles
Jones was drafted by the Philadelphia Eagles in the first round (19th overall) of the 1967 NFL Draft. He was signed by the team on July 6, 1967. He was waived on August 2, 1971. Jones tried to make the team again in the 1972 training camp, but was cut on August 8. He played running back, wide receiver and defensive end for the Eagles during his career.

Coaching career

University of Pittsburgh
Jones was hired by the Pittsburgh Panthers as an assistant football coach under Johnny Majors on January 21, 1973. In 1975, Jones coached future College Football Hall of Fame and Pro Football Hall of Fame running back Tony Dorsett.

References

1945 births
2016 deaths
Sportspeople from Huntington, West Virginia
Players of American football from West Virginia
American football halfbacks
American football running backs
American football wide receivers
American football defensive ends
Arkansas Razorbacks football players
Philadelphia Eagles players
Pittsburgh Panthers football coaches
Enid High School alumni